The men's 85 kilograms event at the 2002 Asian Games took place on October 7, 2002 at Pukyong National University Gymnasium.

Schedule
All times are Korea Standard Time (UTC+09:00)

Records

Results 
Legend
NM — No mark

References
2002 Asian Games Official Report, Page 754
 Weightlifting Database
 Men's results

Weightlifting at the 2002 Asian Games